Magdalene of Bavaria (4 July 1587 – 25 September 1628) was a princess member of the House of Wittelsbach by birth and Countess Palatine of Neuburg and Duchess of Jülich-Berg by marriage.

She was born in Munich, Bavaria, the tenth and youngest child of William V, Duke of Bavaria and Renata of Lorraine.

Life
In 1607 Archduke Matthias of Austria asked the hand of Magdalene in marriage. The initiator of this project was Matthias' consultant Melchior Khlesl, who wanted the Bavarian in the strife between the Archduke and his brother Rudolf II, Holy Roman Emperor. Although Magdalene's father was inclined to accept this union, her brother Maximilian I refused her hand because he didn't want to be involved into the Austrian dynastic disputes. In 1608 Matthias officially renounced to a Bavarian marriage at the request of his brother. Shortly after, Archduke Leopold V showed interest in Magdalene.

In May 1609 Leopold V visited Munich and agreed to renounce his ecclesiastical positions in order to marry Magdalene. During this visit, she developed feelings for her suitor and stated that "for Matthias she didn't have any feelings of affection" and would prefer to become a nun rather than marrying him. Under the pressure of both her father and brother, Magdalene finally accepted in 1613 a marriage of convenience.

On 11 November 1613 at Munich, Magdalene married Wolfgang Wilhelm, Hereditary Prince of the Palatine-Neuburg, a close friend of her brother Maximilian; with this union, the Bavarian rulers hoped that the Lutheran Wolfgang Wilhelm would return to the Catholic faith. The wedding ceremony was performed by the Prince-bishop of Eichstätt, Johann Christoph von Westerstetten, in the Frauenkirche; the subsequent marriage ceremonies were very complex, in the presence of 17 sovereign princes. Three days later (14 November), Magdalene renounced for herself and her descendants to any successions rights over Bavaria. As a dowry, she received the amount of 50,000 guilders and an additional 30,000 florins from her brother as a gift.

Magdalene set up a Catholic chapel at Neuburg Castle with two Jesuits who accompanied her. Shortly after, both Jesuits were sent to the Netherlands by Magdalene's father-in-law Philipp Ludwig, Count Palatine of Neuburg. On one occasion, during a religious service, a guest shot through an open window where Magdalene was.

On 15 May 1614, a few months before his father's death, Wolfgang Wilhelm (under the influence of his wife), in the Düsseldorf Church of St. Lambertus officially took the Catholic faith. For the Counter-Reformation this was significant success justified to Magdalene and her commitment to her brother's policy. The marriage between Magdalene and Wolfgang Wilhelm, despite all the problems, was a very happy one. Magdalene was described as very similar to her brother, wise and politically ambitious. On 4 October 1615 she gave birth to her only child, Philip William, named after both grandparents.

Magdalene died unexpectedly in Neuburg an der Donau aged 41. She was buried in the newly built Neuburger Jesuit Church crypt.

Ancestors

Notes

References
 F. A. Förch: Neuburg und seine Fürsten: ein historischer Versuch als Beitrag zur Geschichte des Fürstenthums Pfalz-Neuburg, A. Prechter, 1860, p. 74.
 Dieter Albrecht: Maximilian I. von Bayern 1573-1651, Oldenbourg Wissenschaftsverlag, 1998, p. 155.

1587 births
1628 deaths
Countesses Palatine of Neuburg
Duchesses of Bavaria
House of Wittelsbach
Daughters of monarchs